All in Good Taste (originally known as It's All in Good Taste) is a Canadian comedy film, which was produced in 1981 but not shown in theaters until 1983.

The film was produced, directed and cowritten by Anthony Kramreither, who was inspired by his own experience as a producer whose creative ambitions had been eclipsed by a commercial imperative to keep his Brightstar Pictures studio operating by making low-budget B-movies.

Premise
The young filmmaker, Timothy (Jonathan Welsh), has a screenplay about an orphan and his dog who are in search of a loving family. Film investors force Timothy into making a movie with sex and violence.

Role of Jim Carrey
Jim Carrey plays a small silent role as the naked cameraman Ralph Parker. After Carrey became a major international film star, however, subsequent video releases of the film emphasized him as its star over most of the actual main cast.

References

External links
 

1983 films
1983 comedy films
Canadian comedy films
English-language Canadian films
1980s English-language films
1980s Canadian films